Sacrosanctum Concilium, the Constitution on the Sacred Liturgy, is one of the constitutions of the Second Vatican Council. It was approved by the assembled bishops by a vote of 2,147 to 4 and promulgated by Pope Paul VI on 4 December 1963. The main aim was to revise the traditional liturgical texts and rituals to reflect more fully fundamental principles, and be more pastorally effective in the changed conditions of the times, clarifying not only the role of ordained ministers but the modalities of appropriate participation of lay faithful in the Catholic Church's liturgy, especially that of the Roman Rite.  The title is taken from the opening lines of the document and means "This Sacred Council".

Title
As is customary with Catholic documents, the name of this constitution, "Sacred Council" in Latin, is taken from the first line (incipit) of the document.

Aggiornamento and participation of the laity
One of the first issues considered by the council, and the matter that had the most immediate effect on the lives of individual Catholics, was the renewal of the liturgy. The central idea was aggiornamento of the traditional liturgical texts and rituals to reflect more fully fundamental principles, and be more pastorally effective in the changed conditions of the times, clarifying not only the role of ordained ministers but the modalities of appropriate participation of lay faithful.

Popes Pius X and Pius XII asked that the people be taught how to chant the responses at Mass and that they learn the prayers of the Mass in order to participate intelligently. Now the bishops decreed that: "To promote active participation, the people should be encouraged to take part by means of acclamations, responses, psalmody, antiphons, and songs." Composers should "produce compositions which ... [provide] for the active participation of the entire assembly of the faithful."

After centuries when, with the Mass in Latin, Catholic piety centred around popular devotions, the bishops decreed that "Popular devotions ... should be so drawn up that they harmonize with the liturgical seasons, accord with the sacred liturgy, are in some fashion derived from it, and lead the people to it, since, in fact, the liturgy by its very nature far surpasses any of them."

Decisions
The council fathers established guidelines to govern the renewal of the liturgy, which included, allowed, and encouraged greater use of the vernacular (native language) in addition to Latin, particularly for the biblical readings and other prayers. Implementation of the council's directives on the liturgy was to be carried out under the authority of Pope Paul VI by a special papal commission, later incorporated in the Congregation for Divine Worship and the Discipline of the Sacraments, and, in the areas entrusted to them, by national conferences of bishops, which, if they had a shared language, were expected to collaborate in producing a common translation.

Legacy 
On 24 August 2017 Pope Francis emphasized that "the reform of the liturgy is irreversible" and called for continued efforts to implement the reforms, repeating what Pope Paul VI had said one year before he died: "The time has come, now, to definitely leave aside the disruptive ferments, equally pernicious in one sense or the other, and to implement fully, according to its right inspiring criteria, the reform approved by us in application of the decisions of the council."

See also

 Mass of Paul VI
 Musicam sacram
 Liturgical Movement

References

Citations

Bibliography

Further reading

 
 
 
 
 

1963 documents
1963 in Christianity
Documents of the Second Vatican Council
Latin texts
Latin words and phrases
Catholic liturgical law